VeloVision was a quarterly magazine that covered specialised bicycles, utility cycling and human power worldwide since 2000 and was originally published and edited by Peter Eland. The format is 230mm x 280mm (slightly over A4). The headquarters of the magazine was in York.

In 2015, Eland retired from publishing the magazine and sold it to a former reader, Howard Yeomans. VeloVision covered utility and delivery bikes, commuting, folding bikes, tandems, special needs cycling, recumbents. The magazine closed in December 2016.

References

External links
 
Special needs cycling guides in issue 11 and issue 19 (PDF)

2000 establishments in the United Kingdom
2016 disestablishments in the United Kingdom
Cycling magazines published in the United Kingdom
Defunct magazines published in the United Kingdom
Magazines established in 2000
Magazines disestablished in 2016
Mass media in York
Quarterly magazines published in the United Kingdom
Transport magazines published in the United Kingdom